A domestic terrorist vehicle-ramming attack occurred on April 23, 2018, when a rented van was driven along Yonge Street through the North York City Centre business district in Toronto, Ontario, Canada. The driver, 25-year-old Alek Minassian, targeted pedestrians, killing 11 and injuring 15, some critically. The incident is the deadliest vehicle-ramming attack in Canadian history.

The attack started at the intersection of Yonge Street and Finch Avenue and proceeded south along the sidewalks of Yonge Street to near Sheppard Avenue. Nine of the eleven deceased victims were women. Minassian was taken into custody just south of the crime scene, after leaving the van and reportedly attempting to commit suicide by cop. The arrest was made at 1:32p.m.EDT, seven minutes after the first 9-1-1 call reporting the incident was made.

The attack is characterized as misogynist terrorism because it was motivated by revenge for perceived sexual and social rejection by women. At the time of his arrest, Minassian described himself as an incel to the police and in prior social media postings, and described the attack as the continuation of an "incel rebellion", started by the late Elliot Rodger.  Minassian pleaded not criminally responsible to the 10 counts of first-degree murder and 16 counts of attempted murder in November 2020, but was found guilty on all counts in March 2021. Anne Molloy, the judge of the case, stated in Minassian's guilty verdict that "working out his exact motivation for this attack is... close to impossible" but she "was inclined to accept" assessments by multiple expert witnesses that Minassian likely lied to the police and that notoriety was his main motivation, although misogyny or incel ideology may have played a role. On June 13, 2022, Minassian was sentenced to life in prison with no possibility of parole for 25 years.

Incident
The first 9-1-1 call reporting pedestrians being hit was received at 1:25 p.m. Eastern Time. At Finch Avenue, a white Chevrolet Express van, rented from Ryder, ran a red light, then drove southbound on the west-side sidewalk of Yonge Street, striking multiple pedestrians. The van continued along the sidewalk for several more blocks, hitting additional pedestrians. Security camera video from a local business shows the van reaching Tolman Street, which is one block south of Finch Avenue, at 1:24 p.m.

Paramedics were immediately called to the site, and Sunnybrook Health Sciences Centre was activated as an emergency centre.

Lam stopped his cruiser near the van and confronted the suspected driver, later identified as Alek Minassian, standing near the opened driver-side door.

During the confrontation, Minassian repeatedly drew his hand from his back pocket and pointed a dark-coloured object toward the officer as if it were a pistol. Lam ordered Minassian to drop to the ground, while Minassian tried repeatedly to provoke the officer to kill him, demanding he be shot "in the head!" when the officer warned him he may be shot. Lam then went to his cruiser and turned off its siren. As Minassian and Lam advanced towards each other, the officer recognized that the object in Minassian's hand was not a gun, holstered his pistol, and took out his baton to avoid the use of unnecessary lethal force. Minassian then dropped the object from his hand, lay down on the ground and surrendered to Lam. He was arrested at 1:32 p.m.

Nine people died at the scenes. At 8:15 p.m., the Toronto Police Service (TPS) announced that a tenth person had died. An eleventh person died on October 28, 2021, after being paralyzed from neck down and never leaving the hospital.

Victims

The eleven victims killed in the attack were:
Beutis Renuka Amarasinghe, 45, nutritionist 
Andrea Knafelc Bradden, 33, Slovenian-Canadian account executive
Geraldine Brady, 83, Avon saleswoman
So He Chung, 22, University of Toronto student
Anne Marie D'Amico, 30, financial analyst
Mary Elizabeth "Betty" Forsyth, 94, retiree
Chul Min "Eddie" Kang, 45, chef
Ji Hun Kim, 22, Seneca College student from South Korea
Munir Najjar, 85, Jordanian retiree visiting family 
Dorothy Sewell, 80, retiree
Amaresh Tesfamariam, 65, nurse (She initially survived the attack, but was paralyzed from neck down and never left the hospital. She died on October 28, 2021, as a result of her injuries.)

Fifteen others were injured, including Robert Anderson, Amir Kiumarsi, Aleksandra Kozhevinikova, Mavis Justino, Morgan McDougall, Jun Seok Park, Samantha Peart, So Ra, Catherine Riddell, Sammantha Samson, Beverly Smith and Yunsheng Tian.

Perpetrator

Police identified the suspect as Alek Minassian, who had no prior criminal history. His father, Vahe, had moved from Armenia to Canada and worked as a software developer, and his mother, Sona, was from Iran and had a job at IT company Compugen Inc.  Minassian was also an aspiring software and mobile app developer.

According to his LinkedIn profile, he was a student at Seneca College in North York from 2011 to 2018 and lived in Richmond Hill. Minassian had attended Sixteenth Avenue Public School, an elementary school in Richmond Hill, in a special education class. His former classmates at Thornlea Secondary School in Thornhill described him as "not overly social" and "harmless". Minassian attended a special needs class for students within the autism spectrum while at Thornlea Secondary School; Minassian's mother is quoted as saying in a 2009 article that her son has Asperger syndrome. Minassian tested in the superior range on several IQ tests.

In late 2017, Minassian enrolled in the Canadian Armed Forces for two months, before requesting voluntary release after 16 days of recruit training. A senior military official said that Minassian "wasn't adapting to military life, including in matters of dress, deportment and group interactions in a military setting" and "there were no red flags and nothing that would point to anything like this."

Following the attack, a Facebook post made by Minassian was uncovered in which he identified himself as an incel ("involuntary celibate"). The state of involuntary celibacy refers to being unable to find sexual partners and its subculture consists of primarily male online communities. The post, dated shortly before the beginning of the attack on April 23, allegedly read:

"Chad" and "Stacy" are nicknames used on incel-related forums within 4chan and Reddit, to refer to popular, attractive, sexually active men and women, respectively. The term "Incel Rebellion" is sometimes used interchangeably with the term "Beta Uprising" or "Beta Male Uprising", which refers to a violent response to sexlessness. Elliot Rodger was the "incel founding father" who committed the 2014 Isla Vista killings in California, and someone whom Minassian claimed to have had contact with up until the days before the 2014 attacks. Rodger intended to target attractive women and sexually successful men, which led to him being posthumously idolized by some people on misogynistic online fringe communities, including several incel websites. Facebook, Inc. verified the account as Minassian's. A source in the Department of National Defence told media that C23249161 was Minassian's military identification number during his army training.

Legal proceedings
On April 24, 2018, Minassian appeared without a lawyer before the Ontario Court of Justice in a Toronto courthouse, shackled and wearing a white prison jumpsuit. He was charged with 10 counts of first degree murder and 13 counts of attempted murder and ordered not to contact any of the alleged attempted murder victims. His father, Vahe Minassian, attended the hearing. He told reporters that he had not spoken to his son. Minassian was charged with three additional counts of attempted murder on May 10: a total of 16 counts. He later retained Toronto criminal defence lawyer Boris Bytensky to represent him. His trial was initially scheduled for February 10, 2020, later moved to March 2, and later moved to April 6, but was postponed again because of the COVID-19 pandemic in Toronto to November.

The trial began on November 10, 2020 and was conducted over Zoom due to the COVID-19 pandemic. Minassian, who had already admitted to planning and carrying out the attack, pleaded not criminally responsible to the 10 counts of first-degree murder and 16 counts of attempted murder. During testimony on November 12, a psychiatrist retained by Minassian's defence team stated in a report that Minassian's "autistic way of thinking was severely distorted in a way similar to psychosis," despite Minassian not being technically psychotic. Attempts by Minassian and his defence to claim that he was not responsible for his actions due to his autism garnered criticism from autism rights advocates, who expressed concerns that the trial might worsen stigmas towards autistic people. Minassian was also found to be highly intelligent.

In the decision, Ontario Superior Court Justice Anne Molloy believed that Minassian seemed to be motivated by the desire for notoriety, and referred to him as "Mr. Doe" so as to avoid giving him further recognition. She wrote, "It is almost impossible to tell when Mr. Doe is lying and when he is telling the truth. Working out his exact motivation for this attack is likewise close to impossible," but that "nevertheless, I am inclined to accept the assessment of all of the experts that Mr. Doe did lie to the police about much of the incel motivation he talked about and that the incel movement was not in fact a primary driving force behind the attack." She also rejected his attempt to use his autism as a defence. On March 3, 2021, Minassian was found guilty on all counts in a verdict that was given by Molloy and streamed live on YouTube. However, sentencing was deferred until 2022 to await the decision of the Supreme Court of Canada in the appeal of Alexandre Bissonnette on whether prisoners can be made to serve murder sentences consecutively. On June 13, 2022, Minassian was sentenced to life in prison with no possibility of parole for 25 years. He filed a notice of appeal the following month, arguing among other things that the trial judge "misapprehended" expert evidence and made unreasonable findings.

Aftermath
The Toronto subway and bus services in the area were immediately closed or rerouted by the Toronto Transit Commission (TTC). Parts of Yonge Street were cordoned off until late on April 24, 2018 for the police investigation. Civic buildings in the area were closed late April 23 and remained closed throughout April 24. Area businesses were allowed to remain open, but in areas of pedestrian deaths, those fronting on Yonge Street were allowed access from only  the rear entrances. Many businesses in the most affected areas chose to close down for all of April 24, while some opened at different times of the afternoon of April 24. The area was fully open and transit services resumed by April 25.

Security was heightened around a meeting of G7 security ministers being held in Toronto in advance of the 44th G7 summit in La Malbaie, Quebec. The ministers were briefed on the attack shortly after it occurred and the day after the attack, the meeting's agenda included discussion on "soft targets", terrorism and social media, and online youth radicalization. The incident was included in the 2018 Public Report on the Terrorism Threat to Canada. Faisal Hussain,  perpetrator of the 2018 Toronto shooting had also developed an interest in inceldom prior to his attack but police found no evidence of radicalization.

Sporting events
Around the Air Canada Centre, roads were closed and blocked off with dump trucks, due to safety concerns for fans gathered at Maple Leaf Square to watch the National Hockey League playoff game between the Toronto Maple Leafs and Boston Bruins on the evening of April 23. A moment of silence was observed during the game in sympathy for the victims.

Concrete barriers were put up along the edge of the northern sidewalk along Bremner Boulevard in front of the Rogers Centre, due to the same safety concerns prior to the Toronto Blue Jays baseball game against the Boston Red Sox on April 24, 2018. Prior to the game, the Blue Jays honoured a few of the first responders in a ceremony, which included a video memorial for the victims of the attack followed by a moment of silence.

Reactions

Many domestic leaders expressed their support and condolences in the immediate aftermath of the attack, including Canadian Prime Minister Justin Trudeau, Opposition Leader Andrew Scheer, Ontario Premier Kathleen Wynne, and Toronto Mayor John Tory.

Constable Ken Lam was lauded as a hero for his measured use of force to achieve a non-fatal resolution of his confrontation with Minassian, despite Minassian's seeking suicide by cop. Lam insisted that he was simply performing his duty.

Lighting at the CN Tower and the 3D Toronto sign at Nathan Phillips Square were colourless and dimmed for the evening of April 23, 2018. Flags were placed at half-mast at most government locations in Toronto and surrounding municipalities.

An impromptu memorial at Olive Square Park on the east-side of Yonge Street, directly across the street from where the attack began, was started by a local resident at 5:15 p.m. of the same day for people to place flowers and express their grief in writing. The person who started the memorial indicated that all the other public spaces along Yonge Street, including Mel Lastman Square, were cordoned off by police tape so he chose Olive Square which was not cordoned off. Small memorials ranging from a few bunches of flowers to about two dozen bunches of flowers, plus paper messages, photographs and candles in some cases, were established at each location from just south of Finch Avenue to just south of Park Home Avenue where a pedestrian was killed (at the southwest corner of Yonge Street and Park Home Avenue two victims were killed). Next to the fountain at the entry to Mel Lastman Square, where the greatest number of people were struck (at least two killed), another memorial gradually grew to become a hub memorial almost as large as the one at Olive Square.

#TorontoStrong
Several crowdfunding campaigns were set up to raise money for the expenses of the victims' families. To better coordinate crowdfunding, the City of Toronto established the #TorontoStrong Fund to support victims and their families, first responders, and those affected by trauma. The hashtag was reused in memoriam of the victims of a fatal mass shooting that occurred in the Danforth on July 22 of the same year.

Several vigils were held in the following week. A small vigil was held at Lastman Square on the evening of April 24. Another was held by the Toronto Korean Community Association on April 27 at Lastman Square. An official #TorontoStrong Vigil was held by the City of Toronto on April 29, attended by several thousand. It began with a march from Yonge Street and Finch Avenue and ended with a gathering at Lastman Square. Speaking at the gathering were community leaders and the event was attended by Prime Minister Trudeau, Governor General Julie Payette, Premier Wynne, Quebec Premier Philippe Couillard, and Mayor Tory.

The two main impromptu memorials at Olive Square Park and Mel Lastman Square were decommissioned on June 3, 2018, and later replaced with a temporary plaque. Mayor John Tory announced plans to erect a permanent memorial for the attack.

On June 13, 2018, the #TorontoStrong's volunteer steering committee announced the appointment of former Toronto mayor Barbara Hall as fund administrator. She was tasked with distributing the money raised for the victims and survivors.

By December 2018, over  million from the fund had been distributed to victims and families of both the van attack and the Danforth shooting.

See also 
 2018 Toronto shooting – known locally as the Danforth shooting and encouraged the same #TorontoStrong hashtag
 École Polytechnique massacre – the second deadliest mass shooting in Canada, which was also motivated by misogyny
 Crime in Toronto
 Controversial Reddit communities, which includes the  /r/incels and /r/braincels, both of which are since banned for condoning violence, rape, and harassment towards women; the latter subreddit was created to circumvent the ban of the former
 2020 Nova Scotia attacks – the deadliest mass shooting in Canada
 2020 Toronto machete attack – a terrorist attack in Toronto that was also motivated by misogyny
 London, Ontario truck attack – a 2021 vehicle-ramming attack that targeted and killed four Muslims

References

External links

City of Toronto – Yonge Street Incident 
Toronto Police – Yonge-Finch Investigation

2018 disasters in Canada
2018 in Toronto
2018 murders in Canada
2018 road incidents
2010s road incidents in North America
2020s trials
21st-century mass murder in North America
April 2018 crimes in North America
April 2018 events in Canada
Attacks in Canada in 2018
Incel-related violence
Manosphere
Mass murder in 2018
Mass murder in Canada
Murder in Ontario
Murder trials
North York
Road incidents in Canada
Trials in Canada
Vehicular rampage in Canada
Violence in Toronto
Women in Toronto